Big government is a pejorative term for a government or public sector that is considered excessively large or unconstitutionally involved in certain areas of public policy or the private sector.

The term may also be used specifically in relation to government policies that attempt to regulate matters considered to be private or personal such as private sexual behavior or individual food choices – similar to the British term 'nanny state'. The term has also been used in the context of the United States to define a dominant federal government that seeks to control the authority of local institutions – an example being the overriding of state authority in favor of federal legislation.

Definition 
Big government is primarily defined by its size, measured by the budget or number of employees, either in absolute terms or relative to the overall national economy.

See also 

 Corporate welfare
 Limited government
 Lemon socialism
 Managerial state
 Minarchism
 Night watchman state
 Small government
 Social engineering (political science)
 Socialism for the rich and capitalism for the poor
 Statism
 Too big to fail
 Welfare state

References 

Libertarian terms
Political ideologies
Political neologisms
Political terminology of the United States
Political slurs
Conservatism in the United States
Right-wing politics in the United States